The Chernihiv kobzari were grouped around the city of Mena, in the Chernihiv Oblast of northeastern Ukraine. Outstanding members of this group were Pavlo Bratytsia, Andriy Beshko, Prokop Dub, Luka Dumenko, A. Haydenko, Petro Heras'ko, Pavlo Kulyk, Tereshko Parkhomenko, Ivan Romanenko, Andriy Shut, Petro Siroshtan, Demian Symonenko, Petro Tkachenko, Semen Vlasko and Semen Zezulia.

The style of playing the bandura used by Chernihiv kobzari became the foundation of the Kyiv academic bandura tradition (Kyiv academic style).

References

Kobzarstvo
Ukrainian musical groups